South Eastern Coalfields Limited (SECL) is the largest coal producing company of India. It is a "Miniratna" Company, and one of eight fully owned subsidiaries of Coal India Limited. The company has its headquarter at Bilaspur, Chhattisgarh, India and 92 mines spread over Chhattisgarh & Madhya Pradesh; 70 underground, 21 opencast, and 1 mixed. It is a schedule 'B' Mini Ratna CPSE in coal & lignite under the administrative control of the Ministry of Coal.

The Company came into existence in 1985, when the Government of India, decided to bifurcate a part of coal mines held by Western Coalfields Limited into new company called South Eastern Coalfields Limited, along with Central Coalfields Limited, which was bifurcated into Northern Coalfields Limited, for administrative purpose.

As of 01.04.2012, the total geological coal reserve in SECL command area is 58253.15 Million tons, out of which 16076.54 Million tons is the proved reserve. The coal deposits of SECL occurs in the great Son-Mahanadi master basin. It spreads over 6 districts namely Korba, Raigarh, Surguja, Surajpur, Balrampur & Korea) in Chhattisgarh (C.G) state and 3 districts viz. Shahdol, Anuppur & Umaria districts in Madhya Pradesh (M.P). The total coal reserve in M.P as of 01.04.2012 is 7407.00 MT while in C.G, it is 50846.15 MT.

Coalfields Under SECL

For effective administrative control and operation, the mines have been grouped in three Coalfields with 13 operating areas -

 Central India Coalfields (CIC) 
 Chirimiri Area
 Baikunthpur Area
 Bishrampur Area
 Hasdeo Area
 Bhatgaon Area (Bhatgaon Colliery)
 Jamuna & Kotma Area
 Sohagpur Area
 Johilla Area
 Korba Coalfields 
 Korba Area 
 Kusmunda Area 
 Dipka Area
 Gevra Area
 Mand-Raigarh Coalfields 
 Raigarh Area

References

Coal India subsidiaries
Coal companies of India
Mining in Chhattisgarh
Companies based in Chhattisgarh
Government-owned companies of India
Indian companies established in 1985
Non-renewable resource companies established in 1985
1985 establishments in Madhya Pradesh